These are the official results of the Men's 110 metres hurdles event at the 1999 IAAF World Championships in Seville, Spain. There were a total number of 42 participating athletes, with six qualifying heats, four quarter-finals, two semi-finals and the final held on Wednesday August 25, 1999, at 20:25h.

Medalists

Final

Semi-final
Held on Tuesday 1999-08-24

Quarter-finals
Held on Monday 1999-08-23

Heats
Held on Monday 1999-08-23

References
 

H
Sprint hurdles at the World Athletics Championships